Statistics of Japanese Regional Leagues in the 1966 season.

Champions list

League standings

Tōkai

Kansai

References

External links 

1966
Japanese Regional Leagues
2